Alif Ailaan was a nonprofit organization working in the field of education in Pakistan from 2013 to 2018. Launched by a team of media and communications specialists, the program aimed to highlight education on priority basis in Pakistan and make the masses aware of the importance of education. It ran campaigns in print, on radio and television, and on social media for awareness of the masses about education. The program conducts seminars and surveys and publishes the highly cited district education rankings report. It also monitored the performance of parliamentarians in reforming education in their constituencies.

Working in the four provinces of Pakistan as well as Azad Jammu and Kashmir, Gilgit-Baltistan and the formerly Federally Administered Tribal Areas, Alif Ailaan identified the weak spots in education through research and aimed to assist decision makers in creating and implementing better education policies.

Contributions 
Alif Ailaan addressed the educational crisis in Pakistan and suggested measures to reform the education landscape. Through their research and data compilation, they assisted decision makers to come up with. Funded by the United Kingdom's Department for International Development, the organization also provided grant support to civil society organisations working for educational reforms and fund research on issues related to education in Pakistan.

District Education Rankings 
Alif Ailaan also released annual District Education Rankings for all districts of Pakistan on the basis of its research. The research examined the state of education in the country's 148 districts and agencies and identified the weak spots in education. According to District Education Rankings 2013, the Punjab was on the top while Baluchistan falls in the bottom. No districts of the Sindh could find a place among top 50.

The 2014 District Education Rankings of 146 districts of Pakistan show that Islamabad was the best performing region in terms of overall standards of education, followed by districts of Punjab and Azad Jammu and Kashmir (AJK).

The 2015 District Education Ranking shows poor performance of Sindh while the performance of Khyber Pakhtunkhwa  for improving its enrollment, retention and gender parity indicators was lauded. Rawalpindi district was on top of the ranking.

Performance of parliamentarians in education sector 
Alif Ailaan also gauged the performance of every Member of the National Assembly on the basis of educational performance in their respective constituencies. They were assessed against four indicators for education – gender parity, physical facilities, student–teacher ratio and retention.

See also 
Pakistan District Education Rankings
Khwarizmi Science Society
The Citizens Foundation

References

External links 
 http://www.alifailaan.pk

Educational organisations based in Pakistan
2013 establishments in Pakistan
2018 disestablishments in Pakistan